Gethin ap Gruffydd (aka. Gethin ap Iestyn Gruffydd) is a Welsh political and cultural activist, born in Merthyr Tydfil.

Anti-Sais Front/Patriotic Front 1964–1969
After leaving school Gruffydd found work at a textile wholesaler in Bath, Somerset, England, and whilst there contacted and became a member of Plaid Cymru. In 1964 he relocated to Fishguard, waiting seven months in preparation for Plaid Cymru's summer conference. At Fishguard, Gruffydd's characteristic approach to political action drew notice for the first time when he tore down Union Jack bunting at a local fête.

At the Fishguard conference Gruffydd first met long term ally, Cwmbran bus conductor Tony Lewis. Together they formed the Anti-Sais Front.

There was some overlap in membership and activities between the Patriotic Front and the Free Wales Army, with Gethin ap Gruffydd and Tony Lewis members of both, and the latter having designed the FWA uniform. By July 1966 they had publicly dissociated themselves from the guerilla gestures of the Free Wales Army, seeking instead to create a political pressure group within Plaid Cymru. They formed the Patriotic Front, setting out to recruit from the Welsh majority English-speaking populace neglected by the likes of Plaid Cymru and Cymdeithas yr Iaith Gymraeg.  The Patriotic Front quickly gained support, with several branches set up in Aberdare, the Rhondda and Cwmbran where Tony Lewis opened a club, The Patriot's Rest, at Pontnewydd.

Gruffydd explained that the intended place for the Patriotic Front was for it to become "...incorporated into Plaid Cymru to cater for the more militant, or positive elements within the party." However, in July 1966 Plaid Cymru leader Gwynfor Evans was elected to Westminster as MP for Carmarthen and, following this first taste of mainstream political success, the party was in no mood to accommodate the exuberant strain of uniformed militancy emerging at its fringes. The Patriotic Front sent as many of its members as possible to Plaid Cymru's next conference in Maesteg, with the entire front row of the hall comprising a fully uniformed PF contingent (PF uniform consisted of green sidecap, khaki shirt and black trousers.) Despite a positive reaction from party leader Evans, others within Plaid Cymru took a negative view of the Patriotic Front and, following a dispute surrounding the use of funds generated by The Patriot's Rest, the PF was outlawed by Plaid at its 1966 Dolgellau conference.

Gruffydd and Lewis created a number of offshoot nationalist organizations designed to appeal to particular interests. The Llewelyn Society sought to remember Llewelyn ein llyw olaf (Llewelyn the Last), the last Welsh Prince of Wales; the Young Patriots League was successful in recruiting numbers of youths; the Lost Lands Liberation League would agitate for the return to Welsh status of areas lost to England, across the counties of Cheshire, Gloucestershire, Hereforedshire, Monmouthshire and Shropshire. Cofiwn Glyndŵr (aka Owain Glyndŵr League) brought together various organizations, including the Free Wales Army, the Welsh Language Society and others, for a 1967 parade through the streets of Machynlleth. Anticipating a clampdown on their activities by Special Branch and the British authorities, the Patriots Aid Committee raised funds in support of the families of imprisoned activists.

Trial and Imprisonment
In 1966, Gruffydd and several others decided to leave the Free Wales Army, disagreeing with the publicity-seeking antics of leader Dennis Coslett. Despite continuing to work with (and later re-joining) the Free Wales Army, in his private correspondence with the FWA's Julian Cayo-Evans, Gruffydd expressed concern over some of the FWA's modus operandi, rightly predicting that it would eventually prove counter-productive.

Wales had seen a spate of bombings in the lead-up to the Investiture of Prince Charles at Caernarfon Castle on July 1, 1969. The FWA was happy to falsely claim responsibility, and nine members were arrested, including Tony Lewis and Gethin ap Gruffydd. Leaders Coslett and Cayo-Evans were charged with offences under the Public Order Act, including firearms and explosive charges, receiving sentences of fifteen months. Gethin ap Gruffydd was given a not guilty verdict on public order charges; he pleaded guilty to organising the Free Wales Army and received a nine-month sentence.

Most of those tried gave various undertakings, including never to become involved in paramilitary activity, to never handle weapons illegally, to never advocate the use of violence for political ends, etc. Of the nine arrested members of the Free Wales Army, only Gethin ap Gruffydd refused to give any such declaration.

Following release from prison and subsequent exile in Ireland, Gruffydd returned to Britain and to political activity - a period documented by Class War's Ian Bone. In his memoir Bash the Rich, Bone describes how he '..got to know (Gruffydd) when I flirted with socialist republicanism in the mid-1970s'. At this time, Gruffydd had set up the Welsh Socialist Vanguard, which included veteran Welsh republican Pedr Lewis and was based at Pencoed near Bridgend.

Bone and Gruffydd went on to find common cause in the newly formed Cymru Goch Mk.I. In Bone's words:

Cofiwn 1970–1984
Together with fellow activist Sian Ifans, Gruffydd became a principal figure behind the 'non-political nationalist organization' Cofiwn (Remember) and Ty Cenedl, which sought to raise nationalist fervour through greater cultural-historical awareness.

'Operation Fire'. On Palm Sunday 1980 fifty-six people were raided and arrested by police; most of the detainees were involved with Cofiwn. Outrage at the repressive action lead to the creation of the Welsh Campaign for Political and Civil Liberties, which drew support from numerous organizations including Plaid Cymru and the Labour Party, Gymdeithas yr Iaith, and the Welsh Socialist Republican Movement. Most of those rounded-up were released within a week, but four were prosecuted.

Cofiwn's last major action was its response to the Wales Festival of Castles. Held in 1983 and sponsored by the Welsh Tourist Board, it was pointed out that the festival concentrated suspiciously heavily upon various of Edward I's castles, built during the Norman conquest. Cofiwn countered with a program of actions, Sarhad '83 (Insult '83).

Continued police interest saw to the group's dissolution by 1984.

Cilmeri
The Patriotic Front was instrumental in creating an annual commemorative event each December at Cilmeri, to mark the killing there in 1282 of Llewelyn the Last. Since the 1960s, the role of organizing the Cilmeri weekend has passed through various hands, Gruffydd however has remained a persistent presence.

References

Bibliography
 Barberis, Peter (Editor)  Encyclopaedia of British and Irish Political Organizations: Parties, Groups and Movements of the Twentieth Century, Pinter Publishers, 2000.
Bone, Ian  Bash the Rich - True-Life Confessions of an Anarchist in the UK, Tangent Book, 2006.
Clews, Roy  To Dream of Freedom. The Story of MAC and the Free Wales Army, Y Lolfa, 1980.
Humphries, John  Freedom Fighters. Wales's Forgotten 'War', 1963–1993, University of Wales Press, 2008.

External links
  List of blogs maintained by Gruffydd

Living people
People from Merthyr Tydfil
Plaid Cymru politicians
Year of birth missing (living people)